Lotus, a latinization of Greek lōtos, is a genus of flowering plants that includes most bird's-foot trefoils (also known as bacon-and-eggs) and deervetches and contains many dozens of species distributed worldwide. Depending on the taxonomic authority, roughly between 70 and 150 are accepted. Lotus is a genus of legumes and its members are adapted to a wide range of habitats, from coastal environments to high altitudes.

The genus Lotus is currently undergoing extensive taxonomic revision. Species native to the Americas have been moved into other genera, such as Acmispon and Hosackia, as in the second edition of The Jepson Manual.

The aquatic plant commonly known as the Indian or sacred lotus is Nelumbo nucifera, a species not closely related to Lotus.

Description

Most species have leaves with five leaflets; two of these are at the extreme base of the leaf, with the other three at the tip of a naked midrib. This gives the appearance of a pair of large stipules below a "petiole" bearing a trefoil of three leaflets – in fact, the true stipules are minute, soon falling or withering. Some species have pinnate leaves with up to 15 leaflets. The flowers are in clusters of three to ten together at the apex of a stem with some basal leafy bracts; they are pea-flower shaped, usually vivid yellow, but occasionally orange or red. The seeds develop in three or four straight, strongly diverging pods, which together make a shape reminiscent of the diverging toes of a small bird, leading to the common name "bird's-foot".

Taxonomy
The genus Lotus is taxonomically complex. It has at times been divided into subgenera and split into segregate genera, but with no consistent consensus. P.H. Raven in 1971 is said to have been the first to suggest that the "New World" (American) and "Old World" (African and Eurasian) species did not belong in the same genus. A molecular phylogenetic study in 2000 based on nuclear ribosomal ITS sequences confirmed this view. The New World species have been divided between the genera Hosackia s.str., Ottleya, Acmispon and Syrmatium. A 2006 study, primarily concerned with Old World Lotus species and hence with limited sampling of the American genera, found that they were all monophyletic. The study also supported the view that Dorycnium and Tetragonolobus are not distinct from Lotus at the generic level. More species were added to the 2006 results in 2008, but did not alter the broad conclusions reached before. Clades were identified within Lotus s.str., some of which were significantly different from the sections into which the genus had been divided. However, resolution was incomplete. The results of the analysis were presented in terms of clades and complexes.

Species

The following species are recognised in the genus Lotus:

Lotus aduncus 
Lotus aegaeus 
Lotus alianus 
Lotus alpinus  - alpine bird's-foot-trefoil
Lotus anfractuosus 
Lotus angustissimus  – slender bird's-foot trefoil
Lotus arabicus 
Lotus arenarius 
Lotus argyrodes 
Lotus arinagensis 
Lotus assakensis 
Lotus australis  – austral trefoil
Lotus axilliflorus 
Lotus becquetii 
Lotus benoistii 
Lotus berthelotii  – Canary Islands trefoil
Lotus biflorus 
Lotus borbasii 
Lotus broussonetii 
Lotus brunneri 
Lotus burttii 
Lotus callis-viridis 
Lotus campylocladus 
Lotus carpetanus 
Lotus castellanus 
Lotus chazaliei 
Lotus compactus 
Lotus conimbricensis 
Lotus conjugatus 
Lotus corniculatus  – common bird's-foot trefoil, bird's-foot deervetch
Lotus creticus 
Lotus cruentus 
Lotus cytisoides 
Lotus × davyae 
Lotus discolor 
Lotus divaricatus 
Lotus dorycnium 
Lotus drepanocarpus 
Lotus dumetorum 
Lotus edulis 
Lotus emeroides 
Lotus eremiticus 
Lotus eriophthalmus 
Lotus frondosus 
Lotus fulgurans 
Lotus garcinii 
Lotus gebelia 
Lotus germanicus 
Lotus glacialis 
Lotus glareosus 
Lotus glaucus 
Lotus glinoides 
Lotus goetzei 
Lotus gomerythus 
Lotus graecus 
Lotus halophilus 
Lotus hebecarpus 
Lotus hebranicus 
Lotus herbaceus 
Lotus hirsutus 
Lotus holosericeus 
Lotus jacobaeus 
Lotus japonicus 
Lotus jolyi 
Lotus jordanii 
Lotus krylovii 
Lotus kunkelii 
Lotus lalambensis 
Lotus lancerottensis 
Lotus lanuginosus 
Lotus laricus 
Lotus latidentatus 
Lotus lebrunii 
Lotus longisiliquosus 
Lotus lourdes-santiagoi 
Lotus loweanus 
Lotus macranthus 
Lotus maculatus 
Lotus maritimus 
Lotus maroccanus 
Lotus mascaensis 
Lotus × medioximus 
Lotus michauxianus 
Lotus × minoricensis 
Lotus miyakojimae 
Lotus mlanjeanus 
Lotus mollis 
Lotus namulensis 
Lotus nubicus 
Lotus oliveirae 
Lotus ononopsis 
Lotus ornithopodioides 
Lotus palustris 
Lotus parviflorus  – smallflower bird's-foot trefoil, smallflower trefoil
Lotus peczoricus 
Lotus pedunculatus  – greater bird's-foot trefoil, marsh bird's-foot trefoil, large bird's-foot trefoil, big trefoil
Lotus peregrinus 
Lotus polyphyllos 
Lotus pseudocreticus 
Lotus purpureus 
Lotus pyranthus 
Lotus quinatus 
Lotus rechingeri 
Lotus rectus 
Lotus requienii 
Lotus robsonii 
Lotus sanguineus 
Lotus schoelleri 
Lotus sessilifolius 
Lotus simoneae 
Lotus spartioides 
Lotus spectabilis 
Lotus stepposus 
Lotus strictus 
Lotus subbiflorus  – hairy bird's-foot trefoil
Lotus subdigitatus 
Lotus taitungensis 
Lotus tenellus  (including Lotus leptophyllus (Lowe) K.Larsen)
Lotus tenuis  – narrowleaf trefoil, slender trefoil, creeping trefoil, or prostrate trefoil
Lotus tetragonolobus 
Lotus tetraphyllus 
Lotus tibesticus 
Lotus torulosus 
Lotus × ucrainicus 
Lotus villicarpus 
Lotus weilleri 
Lotus wildii 
Lotus zemmouriensis

Species placed elsewhere

Lotus aboriginus = Hosackia rosea
Lotus argophyllus = Acmispon argophyllus
Lotus argyraeus = Acmispon argyraeus
Lotus benthamii = Acmispon cytisoides
Lotus crassifolius = Hosackia crassifolia
Lotus dendroideus = Acmispon dendroideus
Lotus denticulatus = Acmispon denticulatus
Lotus grandiflorus = Acmispon grandiflorus
Lotus hamatus = Acmispon micranthus
Lotus haydonii = Acmispon haydonii 
Lotus heermannii = Acmispon heermannii
Lotus humistratus = Acmispon brachycarpus
Lotus incanus = Hosackia incana
Lotus junceus = Acmispon junceus
Lotus mearnsii = Acmispon mearnsii
Lotus micranthus = Acmispon parviflorus
Lotus nevadensis = Acmispon decumbens
Lotus nuttallianus = Acmispon prostratus
Lotus oblongifolius = Hosackia oblongifolia
Lotus pinnatus = Hosackia pinnata
Lotus procumbens = Acmispon procumbens
Lotus rubriflorus = Acmispon rubriflorus
Lotus salsuginosus = Acmispon maritimus
Lotus stipularis = Hosackia stipularis
Lotus wrightii = Ottleya wrightii

Uses and ecology

Lotus species are used as food plants by the larvae of some Lepidoptera species. Several species are cultivated for forage, including L. corniculatus, L. glaber, and L. pedunculatus. They can produce toxic cyanogenic glycosides which can be potentially toxic to livestock, but also produce tannins, which are a beneficial anti-bloating compound.

Species in this genus can fix nitrogen from the air courtesy of their root nodules, making them useful as a cover crop. The nodulating symbionts are Bradyrhizobium and Mesorhizobium bacteria. Scientific research for crop improvement and understanding the general biology of the genus is focused on L. japonicus, which is currently the subject of a full genome sequencing project, and is considered a model organism.

Some species, such as L. berthelotii from the Canary Islands, are grown as ornamental plants. L. corniculatus is an invasive species in some regions of North America and Australia.

References

External links

 Lotus species names

 
Fabaceae genera
Taxa named by Carl Linnaeus